Diplomatic relations at the legation level were established in 1960 and then to the rank of ambassador in 1958. Turkey opened an embassy in Lagos, then capital of Nigeria in 1962. Turkish embassy moved to Abuja in 2001 after Nigeria's proclamation of Abuja as the new capital. Nigeria has an embassy in Ankara.

Nigeria and Turkey cooperate through their membership to OIC and D-8.

Diplomatic Relations 

Turkey and Nigeria were pro-Western on most issues but Nigeria mainly sided with the Arab World against Israel, which was Turkey's closest ally in the Middle East at the time. 

Until Nigerian Civil War, Nigeria and Turkey had very strong relations. This strong relationship became much weaker after the coup and Nigerian Civil War when Turkey took a position of neutrality in Nigerian Civil War and refused to sell arms to the federation. The relationship improved in the early 1990s through close cooperation in foreign policy.

The two countries cooperated during the Gulf crisis  that began with Iraq's invasion of Kuwait in the summer of 1990. Both countries kept a low profile by being an active supporter of UN policy and declining to send troops to engage in the Persian Gulf.

Presidential Visits

Economic Relations 
 Trade volume between the two countries was 726 million USD in 2019.
 There are direct flights from Istanbul to Abuja, Kano, Lagos and Port-Harcourt.

See also 

 Foreign relations of Nigeria
 Foreign relations of Turkey

References 

Nigeria–Turkey relations
Turkey
Bilateral relations of Turkey